Spring Gully Conservation Park, formerly the Spring Gully National Park), is a protected area located in the Australian state of South Australia in the localities of Sevenhills and Spring Gully about  south of the town centre in Clare.  

The conservation park consists of land in sections 142, 365, 568  and 572 in the cadastral unit of the Hundred of Clare. Section 568 was proclaimed on 12 January 1961 as a wildlife reserve under the Crown Lands Act 1929. Section 572 was dedicated as a wildlife reserve on 20 January 1966. On 9 November 1967,  land in sections 568 and 572  was  proclaimed under the National Parks Act 1966 as the Spring Gully National Park. Section 365 was added to the national park on 21 March 1968. On 27 April 1972, land in sections 365, 568  and 572 was proclaimed as the Spring Gully Conservation Park. Section 142 was added to the conservation park on 9 September 1976.

In 1980, the conservation park was described as follows:This park preserves the only stand of red stringybark (Eucalyptus macrorhyncha) in South Australia.  It is a relic population left behind from a wetter time, the nearest populations occurring near Dubbo in New South Wales and Cape Otway in Victoria.  Fine views over the plains to the west can be seen from this park which is used by locals as a picnic area…
Spring Gully is situated on a western ridge of the northern Mount Lofty Ranges, approximately 15km south of Clare.  It has an open forest association dominated by Eucalyptus macrorhyncha on its upper slopes, particularly in the northern portion and has been cleared in its southern portion. Blackboys (Xanthorrhoea sp.) occur in the more open areas.  Western grey kangaroos and euros occur in the ranges here…
Approximately a quarter of the park is cleared land…

The flora of the conservation park includes Caladenia argocalla (white beauty spider orchid), a species listed both nationally and at state level as "endangered". 

Thousands of the red stringybark trees died following the very dry period from mid-2007 to early 2008 and the record heat-wave of March 2008.  The leaves of others died, while the trees survived and later produced epicormic shoots; as of mid-2009 many of these had also died.  An apparently small section of the conservation park (20ha) was burned in a lightning-ignited bushfire on 20 November 2009, further stressing some of the trees.

A portion of the Riesling Trail known as the Spring Gully Loop passes along the northern side of the conservation park.

The conservation park is classified as an IUCN Category III protected area. In 1980, it was listed on the now-defunct Register of the National Estate.

See also
 Protected areas of South Australia

References

External links
Spring Gully Conservation Park official webpage
  Spring Gully Conservation Park webpage on the Protected Planet website
 Climate change hits the Clare Valley: Spring Gully Conservation Park

Mid North (South Australia)
Conservation parks of South Australia
1961 establishments in Australia
Protected areas established in 1961
South Australian places listed on the defunct Register of the National Estate